Trevor "Tosh" Chamberlain (11 July 1934 – 10 January 2021) was an English professional footballer. He played at outside left.

Chamberlain began his career as a youth player with Middlesex and London, and gained youth international honours for his country. In 1952 he joined Fulham, for whom he made 204 first-team appearances, scoring 64 goals, before leaving for Dover Athletic in 1965. He finished his professional career at Gravesend and Northfleet.

Career
Chamberlain was born in Kings Cross, London, and as a youth joined the local boys club The Mary Ward Settlement, in Bloomsbury, where he played in the London Federation of Boys Club Leagues. He was also a schoolboy international before signing for Fulham. After spending his youth career in London and Middlesex, Chamberlain signed for Fulham in 1954, encouraging his schoolboy friend Johnny Haynes to join him there. He made his debut in November that year. Two years later, after his National Service, in Chamberlain's first team game in 1954, with his first kick in the very first minute, he scored a goal against Lincoln City. Next season, he even postponed his wedding day in order to play against Newcastle United in pouring rain in the fourth round of the FA Cup. Chamberlain scored a hat trick, but Fulham lost 5–4. His last game was in a FA Cup third-round replay at Millwall on 11 January 1965.

After retirement
After retiring from football, Chamberlain worked for Richmond Park authorities in the 1980s and '90s. He also worked as a sports instructor at Elliott School in Putney. He was frequently seen at Craven Cottage and continued to support Fulham.

Chamberlain died on 10 January 2021, aged 86.

Career statistics

References 

1934 births
2021 deaths
Footballers from Greater London
English footballers
Association football forwards
Fulham F.C. players
Ebbsfleet United F.C. players
Dover Athletic F.C. players
English Football League players